Clube Desportivo São Salvador or C.D. São Salvador is an Angolan sports club in Zaire Province.

In 2013, the team participated in the Gira Angola, the qualifying tournament for Angola's top division, the Girabola.

League & Cup Positions

References

Football clubs in Angola
Sports clubs in Angola